Somkiat Pongpaiboon (Thai script: สมเกียรติ พงษ์ไพบูลย์; 12 January 1950 – 14 November 2021) was a Thai Professor at Nakhon Ratchasima Rajabhat University, Nakhon Ratchasima Province, Thailand. He became a member of the Thai House of Representatives in 2007 from Democrat Party and a leader of the People's Alliance for Democracy, and the co-founder of the Mass Party. Somkiat was an advocate for the poor and a major critic of Prime Minister Thaksin Shinawatra.

Activism and key works
Somkiat claimed to have been investigated three times for organizing protests for poor farmers against government officials and politicians.

Somkiat claimed to have written many academic papers and provided many academic researches regarding social development and strategy to counter poverty.  He was also a regular contributor to many newspapers and magazines.

The People's Alliance for Democracy
In February 2006, Pongpaiboon was selected to be one of the five leaders of People's Alliance for Democracy (PAD). Somkiat represented the Thai academic community.

Pongpaiboon was considered a charismatic public speaker.

The Mass Party
In May 2006, Somkiat and other PAD leaders established the Mass Party. Somkiat claimed that "Our objective is to campaign against Thaksinomics."  The party unconventionally planned not to field MP candidates for the first 5 years, while Somkiat claimed that "If we field MP candidates, we will be trapped in vicious circles of money politics."  Other party co-founders included former Palang Dharma Party leader Chaiwat Sinsuwong and the Campaign for Popular Democracy's Pipob Thongchai.

Death
Somkiat died on 14 November 2021 from cerebral hemorrhage at Maharat Nakhon Ratchasima Hospital.

References 

1950 births
2021 deaths
Somkiat Pongpaiboon
Somkiat Pongpaiboon
Somkiat Pongpaiboon
Somkiat Pongpaiboon
Somkiat Pongpaiboon